The 2016 Oman Super Cup was the 14th edition of the Oman Super Cup, an annual football match between Fanja SC, the champions of the 2015-16 Oman Professional League and Saham Club the winners of the 2015-16 Sultan Qaboos Cup. The match was played at the Al-Seeb Stadium in Al-Seeb, Oman.

On 8 September 2016, Saham claimed their Super Cup title after securing a 1-0 win over Fanja. Their new signing Badar Al-Jabri struck in the second half to secure a thrilling 1-0 win over the defending Oman Professional League champions in the opening game of the 2016-17 Omani football season.

Match details

References

External links
2016 Oman Super Cup - SOCCERWAY
2015 Oman Super Cup - Goalzz.com

Oman Super Cup seasons
Cup
Oman